Cheguig is a municipality in El Bayadh Province, Algeria. It is part of the district of Rogassa and has a population of 1693, which gives it 7 seats in the PMA. Its municipal code is 3217 and postal code is 32250.

Communes of El Bayadh Province